We'll Meet Again is a 2002 film, based on the novel of the same name by Mary Higgins Clark.

Plot
Socialite Molly Lasch is released from prison after serving a six-year sentence for the murder of her husband, Dr. Gary Lasch. Now with the help of Fran, an investigative reporter, Molly sets out to prove her innocence. Together they uncover a conspiracy of silence at the Lasch Medical Center and a shocking secret that could cost both women their lives.

Cast
 Laura Leighton as Fran Silman 

 Brandy Ledford as Molly Lasch
 Gedeon Burkhard as Dr. Peter Gaynes
 Andrew Jackson as Nick Whitehall
 Anne Openshaw as Jenna Whitehall

References

External links

2002 television films
2002 films
2000s crime films
Films about journalists
Films about miscarriage of justice
Films based on American novels
Films based on crime novels
American thriller television films
2000s American films